The University of Strasbourg (Unistra) is a public research university located in Strasbourg, Alsace, France, with over 52,000 students and 3,300 researchers.

The French university traces its history to the earlier German-language Universität Straßburg, which was founded in 1538, and was divided in the 1970s into three separate institutions: Louis Pasteur University, Marc Bloch University, and Robert Schuman University. On 1 January 2009, the fusion of these three universities reconstituted a united University of Strasbourg. With as many as 19 Nobel laureates, and two Fields Medal winners, the university is ranked among the best in the League of European Research Universities.

History

The university emerged from a Lutheran humanist German Gymnasium, founded in 1538 by Johannes Sturm in the Free Imperial City of Strassburg. It was transformed to a university in 1621 and elevated to the ranks of a royal university in 1631. Among its earliest university students was Johann Scheffler who studied medicine and later converted to Catholicism and became the mystic and poet Angelus Silesius.

The Lutheran German university still persisted even after the annexation of the city by King Louis XIV in 1681 (one famous student was Johann Wolfgang von Goethe in 1770/71), but mainly turned into a French speaking university during the French Revolution.

The university was refounded as the German Kaiser-Wilhelm-Universität in 1872, after the Franco-Prussian war and the annexation of Alsace-Lorraine to Germany provoked a westwards exodus of Francophone teachers. During the German Empire the university was greatly expanded and numerous new buildings were erected because the university was intended to be a showcase of German against French culture in Alsace. In 1918, Alsace-Lorraine was returned to France, so a reverse exodus of Germanophone teachers took place.

During the Second World War, when France was occupied, personnel and equipment of the University of Strasbourg were transferred to Clermont-Ferrand. In its place, the short-lived German Reichsuniversität Straßburg was created.

In 1971, the university was subdivided into three separate institutions:
 Louis Pasteur University (Strasbourg I)
 Marc Bloch University (Strasbourg II)
 Robert Schuman University (Strasbourg III)

These were, however, reunited in 2009, and were able to be among the first twenty French universities to gain greater autonomy.

Buildings 

The university campus covers a vast part near the center of the city, located between the "Cité Administrative", "Esplanade" and "Gallia" bus-tram stations.

Modern architectural buildings include: Escarpe, the Doctoral College of Strasbourg, Supramolecular Science and Engineering Institute (ISIS), Atrium, Pangloss, PEGE (Pôle européen de gestion et d'économie) and others. The student residence building for the Doctoral College of Strasbourg was designed by London-based Nicholas Hare Architects in 2007. The structures are depicted on the main inner wall of the Esplanade university restaurant, accompanied by the names of their architects and years of establishment.

The administrative organisms, attached to the university (Prefecture; CAF, LMDE, MGEL—health insurance; SNCF—national French railway company; CTS—Strasbourg urban transportation company), are located in the "Agora" building.

Nobel laureates 
Karl Ferdinand Braun
Paul Ehrlich
Hermann Emil Fischer
Jules Hoffmann
Albrecht Kossel
Martin Karplus
Charles Louis Alphonse Laveran
Jean-Marie Lehn
Otto Loewi
Otto Fritz Meyerhof
Louis Néel
Wilhelm Röntgen
Albert Schweitzer
Hermann Staudinger 
Adolf von Baeyer
Max von Laue
Pieter Zeeman
Jean-Pierre Sauvage

Notable people

 Simon Schraub

Rankings

See also 
 Reichsuniversität Straßburg
 Jardin botanique de l'Université de Strasbourg
 List of early modern universities in Europe
 On the Poverty of Student Life
 Musée de minéralogie
 Musée zoologique de la ville de Strasbourg

References

External links 
 
 University of Strasbourg 
 The Art and Science collections of the University of Strasbourg

 
Educational institutions established in the 1620s
Education in Strasbourg
Public universities in France
Buildings and structures in Strasbourg
Tourist attractions in Strasbourg
Universities and colleges formed by merger in France